Tornik is a village in Serbia. It is situated in the Ljubovija municipality, in the Mačva District of Central Serbia. The village had a Serb ethnic majority and a population of 168 in 2002.

Historical population

1948: 404
1953: 433
1961: 441
1971: 401
1981: 329
1991: 221
2002: 168

References

See also
List of places in Serbia

Populated places in Mačva District
Ljubovija